Lim Shiya (born 26 June 1986) is a Singaporean footballer who formerly plays as a midfielder for Australian W-League team Perth Glory and the Singapore women's national football team.

Club career 
Lim made her team debut for Home United FC (Women's Team) in the FAS Women's Challenge Cup 2001 at the age of 15 and played for FAS Young Women in 2003 before moving to Arion Women's Football Club, the Singapore's first all-women football club in 2006. A left-footed attacking midfielder who possesses good pace and dribbling skills, Shiya is known for her vision, technique and passing. She is also a regular goal scorer for her club.

In 2008, Lim joined Australian W-League team Perth Glory and became the first Singaporean woman national footballer to play professionally. She played for Perth Glory till 2009.

International career 
Lim made her debut for the Singapore Women's National Team on 18 April 2004, coming off the bench against Hong Kong in the AFC Beijing Olympics Qualifiers 2004 held at Hiroshima Big Arch Stadium in Osaka, Japan. 

Lim has represented Singapore in AFC U19 Women's Championship 2004 (China) and 2006 (Jordan), AFF Women's Championship 2004 (Vietnam), FIFA Women's U19 World Cup International Friendly 2004 (Thailand), AFC Beijing Olympics Qualifiers 2004 (Japan) and AFC Women's Asian Cup Qualifiers 2008 (Malaysia).

References 

Singaporean women's footballers
Living people
Perth Glory FC (A-League Women) players
1986 births
Expatriate women's soccer players in Australia
Women's association football wingers
Singapore women's international footballers
Singaporean sportspeople of Chinese descent